The Royal Bournemouth Hospital is an acute general hospital in Bournemouth, Dorset, England. It is managed by the University Hospitals Dorset NHS Foundation Trust. The hospital was managed by The Royal Bournemouth and Christchurch Hospitals NHS Foundation Trust until the merger with Poole Hospital NHS Foundation Trust on 1 October 2020.

Location
The hospital is located a short distance from the Wessex Way (A338) in Castle Lane East (A3060) in Bournemouth. It is served by bus routes operated by Wilts & Dorset.

History
The first phase of the hospital, which replaced the Royal Victoria Hospital, opened in 1989. A second phase of the hospital was opened by Princess Anne in 1992. A Cardiac Intervention Unit was opened in April 2005 and the Derwent Hospital, a 28-bed unit previously operated as a private hospital, was purchased in 2007.

Various acute services were transferred from Christchurch Hospital to the Royal Bournemouth Hospital in 2010.

On 3 November 2021, a ceremony was carried out to mark the start of construction work on building a new wing. The project is part of a £250million reorganisation of healthcare in Dorset.

On 6 May 2022, Charles, Prince of Wales opened a lavender garden at the hospital dedicated to hospital staff who died during the Covid-19 pandemic.

Services
It has a 24-hour accident & emergency department. It also provides district-wide services for vascular surgery and urology. Outpatient clinics are provided for oral surgery, paediatrics, plastic surgery, ENT (ears, nose and throat), cardiothoracic and neurology.

It is also the home to a diabetic unit called BDEC, which treats and educates local patients diagnosed with the disease.

Performance
The independent regulator, the Care Quality Commission (CQC), rated the Royal Bournemouth Hospital as "Good" overall in March 2018. The findings of the report are summarised in the table below:

Porters
A 12-minute film entitled Porters made by students from Newport Film School at the hospital in 2015, told the story of the hospital's porters.  It won a number of awards and was added to the British Film Institute's national archives.

Other hospitals in group
 Christchurch Hospital, Dorset
 Poole Hospital

See also
 Healthcare in Dorset
 List of hospitals in England

Notes

References

External links 

 
 Inspection reports from the Care Quality Commission

Hospital buildings completed in 1989
Buildings and structures in Bournemouth
Hospitals in Dorset
NHS hospitals in England

Teaching hospitals in England